Francesco Ivaldi (born 27 September 1977) is an Italian yacht racer who competed in the 2000 Summer Olympics.

References

External links
 
 
 

1977 births
Living people
Italian male sailors (sport)
Olympic sailors of Italy
Sailors at the 2000 Summer Olympics – 470
Place of birth missing (living people)